Félicien Vervaecke (11 March 1907 – 31 October 1986, in Brussels) was a Belgian professional cyclist from 1930 to 1939. In the Tour de France he showed good results, finishing three times on the podium (second once, third twice). In 1935 and 1937 he won the mountain classification, and overall he won six stages.
In the 1936 Tour de France, Vervaecke was on his way to the second place, but bad luck prevented it. First his bicycle broke, and he had to convince a spectator to lend his. Then he suffered a flat tire, and Tour officials forced him to wait for the reserve car. Antonin Magne passed him. When Vervaecke got his tire, he raced back to Magne, and finished 18 seconds behind him. But he still finished third, as he received 10 minutes penalty because his wife had given him drinks during the race, which was not allowed.
In the 1937 Tour de France, Vervaecke won the mountain classification despite not finishing the race, something no longer allowed.

He was the first Belgian cyclist to win a stage in the Giro d'Italia.

After his cycling career, Vervaecke started a bicycle shop in Brussels. He was the first manager of Eddy Merckx.

His older brother Julien Vervaecke was also successful, finishing third in the 1927 Tour de France.

Major results

1929
 Paris-Lens
 Tourcoing-Dunkerque-Tourcoing
1932
Tour de France:
Did not finish
Tour de Corrèze
1934
Tour de France:
Final classification: 4th place
Giro d'Italia: Stage 8
1935
Tour de France
Final classification: 3rd place
Winner Mountains classification
Paris–Nice: Stage 5B
1936
Tour de France
Final classification: 3rd place
Winner of stage 19B
Paris–Nice: Stage 1
1937
Tour de France
did not finish
Winner Mountains classification
Winner stage 10
Paris–Nice: Stage 5A
1938
Tour de France
Final classification: 2nd place
Winner of stage 4C
Winner of stage 8
Winner of stage 10B
Winner of stage 20B
1939
Tour de France
did not finish

Teams
1930: Alcyon
1931: Alcyon and Labor
1932-1933: Labor
1934: Labor and Gamma
1935-1936: Labor and Alcyon
1937-1939: Labor

References

External links
Official Tour de France palmares

Belgian male cyclists
Belgian Tour de France stage winners
1907 births
1986 deaths
Cyclists from West Flanders
People from Moorslede